In Gallo-Roman religion, Dea Aveta was a mother goddess, also associated with the freshwater spring at Trier in what is now Germany. Aveta is known mainly from clay figurines found at Toulon-sur- Allier in France and at Trier. These figurines show the goddess with infants at the breast, small lap-dogs, or baskets of fruit. There was a temple dedicated to Aveta in the Altbachtal complex at Trier.
Her name is also known from inscriptions found in Switzerland and the Côte-d'Or (France).

References

External links
 

Gaulish goddesses
Mother goddesses
Water goddesses